Odoardo Farnese (28 April 1612 – 11 September 1646), also known as Odoardo I Farnese to distinguish him from his grandson Odoardo II Farnese, was Duke of Parma, Piacenza and Castro from 1622 to 1646.

Biography

Odoardo was the eldest legitimate son of Ranuccio I Farnese and Margherita Aldobrandini. After Ranuccio's natural son and his potential rival, Ottavio, was relegated in a prison, he reigned initially under the regency of his uncle Odoardo Farnese and, after the latter's death, of his mother, Margherita Aldobrandini.

He came of age in 1628 and in the same year he married Margherita de' Medici, Grand Duke of Tuscany Cosimo II de' Medici's daughter. His first notable act as Duke was an alliance with France in 1633, a move designed to counter Spanish predominance in northern Italy and support his territorial ambitions. He also asked for loans to improve the army, but his first campaigns were ineffective: Piacenza was occupied by the Spanish troops, and his army was defeated by Francesco I d'Este. Spanish troops overran the duchy and devastated the countryside, but did not attempt to lay siege to the cities. In the absence of French assistance, Odoardo was convinced by Pope Urban VIII to sign a treaty of peace with Spain in 1637.

His aggressive rule of Castro, a Farnese fief in the Papal States north of Rome, who the Barberini (Pope Urban's family) were eager to acquire, caused Odoardo to be excommunicated in 1641. Instead of reconciliation, he sought alliances with Venice, Florence and the Duchy of Modena, and invaded northern Lazio with 7,000 troops. His army was composed mostly of cavalry, and were unable to recover Castro by siege. Although the Farnese fleet was destroyed and the Duke often proved recalcitrant, in the peace of 1644, the city of Castro was returned to him and Odoardo was reconciled with the Roman Catholic Church and readmitted to the Sacraments.

Odoardo died suddenly in Piacenza, his favorite residence, on 11 September 1646.

Marriage and children
Odoardo Farnese married Margherita de Medici (31 May 1612 – 6 February 1679) on 11 October 1628, the daughter of Cosimo II de' Medici, Grand Duke of Tuscany. They had the following children:

Caterina Farnese (2 October 1629) died at birth.
Ranuccio II Farnese (1630–1694) married Princess Margaret Yolande of Savoy (1), Isabella d'Este (2), Maria d'Este
Maria Maddalena Farnesio (c.1633/1638 - 1693)
Alessandro Farnese (10 January 1635 – 18 February 1689), Governor of the Habsburg Netherlands from 1678 to 1682
Orazio Farnese (24 January 1636 – 2  November 1656)
Caterina Farnese (3 September 1637 – 24 April 1684) Carmelitan nun
Pietro Farnese (4 April 1639 – 4 March 1677)
Ottavio Farnese (5 January 1641 – 4 August 1641) died in infancy.

See also
First War of Castro

References

1612 births
1646 deaths
People temporarily excommunicated by the Catholic Church
Odoardo
Odoardo
17th-century Italian nobility
Burials at the Sanctuary of Santa Maria della Steccata
Odoardo